The Otto Struve Telescope was the first major telescope to be built at McDonald Observatory.  Located in the Davis Mountains in West Texas, the Otto Struve Telescope was designed by Warner & Swasey Company and constructed between 1933 and 1939 by the Paterson-Leitch Company. Its  mirror was the second largest in the world at the time. It was named after the Russian-American astronomer Otto Struve in 1966, three years after his death; Struve  had been the director of McDonald Observatory from 1932–1950.

The Davis Mountains is an excellent location for astronomical research because of the clear dry air and moderately high elevation. The remote nature of the facility proved to be a significant challenge in transporting such a large mirror.  It was a very precarious journey for the Otto Struve Telescope's mirror to this remote part of Texas and up to the top of Mount Locke. The mirror was transported from the local town of Fort Davis up the mountain by Carleton D. Wilson, owner of a local trucking company, while locals cheered as they looked on.

The Otto Struve telescope is still in use today. It is updated with modern imaging detectors allowing astronomers to conduct many types of research.

Noted applications and Discoveries 
The telescope was one of two used to set up and define the Johnson-Morgan UBV photometric system.

In 1949, G. Kuiper of Yerkes Observatory discovered a new moon of planet Neptune, named Nereid. The moon was discovered on photographic plates taken in a search for moons of Neptune.

Contemporaries on commissioning 
The Otto Struve telescope saw first light in 1939, behind the 100-inch Hooker telescope and ahead of two large British Commonwealth telescopes, both in Canada. Many competing projects were delayed due to the war in the early 1940s.

Four largest telescopes in 1939:

See also
List of largest optical telescopes in the 20th century
List of largest optical reflecting telescopes
List of the largest optical telescopes in the contiguous United States

Notes

References

External links 

 "Pour Three Ton Telescope Mirror." Popular Science, April 1934, p. 41.
 Science: The 82-Inch McDonald Telescope (1939), industrial film capturing the construction and design of the Otto Struve Telescope, Texas Archive of the Moving Image. 

Telescopes
University of Texas at Austin